The Göktürks, Celestial Turks or Blue Turks were a nomadic confederation of Turkic peoples in medieval Inner Asia. The Göktürks, under the leadership of Bumin Qaghan (d. 552) and his sons, succeeded the Rouran Khaganate as the main power in the region and established the First Turkic Khaganate, one of several nomadic dynasties that would shape the future geolocation, culture, and dominant beliefs of Turkic peoples.

Etymology

Origin
It is generally accepted that the name Türk is ultimately derived from the Old-Turkic migration-term 𐱅𐰇𐰼𐰰 Türük/Törük, which means 'created, born'.

They were known in Middle Chinese historical sources as the Tūjué (reconstructed in Middle Chinese as romanized: *dwət-kuɑt > tɦut-kyat). 

The ethnonym was also recorded in various other Middle Asian languages, such as Sogdian *Türkit ~ Türküt, tr'wkt, trwkt, turkt > trwkc, trukč; Khotanese Saka Ttūrka/Ttrūka, Ruanruan to̤ro̤x/türǖg and Old Tibetan Drugu.

Definition
According to Chinese sources, Tūjué meant "combat helmet", reportedly because the shape of the Altai Mountains, where they lived, was similar to a combat helmet. Róna-Tas (1991) pointed to a Khotanese-Saka word, tturakä "lid", semantically stretchable to "helmet", as a possible source for this folk etymology, yet Golden thinks this connection requires more data.

Göktürk means "Celestial Turk", or sometimes "Blue Turk" (i.e. because sky blue is associated with celestial realms). This is consistent with "the cult of heavenly ordained rule" which was a recurrent element of Altaic political culture and as such may have been imbibed by the Göktürks from their predecessors in Mongolia. The name of the ruling Ashina clan may derive from the Khotanese Saka term for "deep blue", āššɪna.

According to the American Heritage Dictionary the word Türk meant "strong" in Old Turkic; though Gerhard Doerfer supports this theory, Gerard Clauson points out that "the word Türk is never used in the generalized sense of 'strong'" and that the noun Türk originally meant "'the culminating point of maturity' (of a fruit, human being, etc.), but more often used as an [adjective] meaning (of a fruit) 'just fully ripe'; (of a human being) 'in the prime of life, young, and vigorous'".

The name as used by the Göktürks only applied to themselves, the Göktürk khanates, and their subjects. The Göktürks did not consider other Turkic speaking groups such as the Uyghurs, Tiele, and Kyrgyz to be Türks. In the Orkhon inscriptions, the Toquz Oghuz and the Yenisei Kyrgyz are not referred to as Türks. Similarly, the Uyghurs called themselves Uyghurs and used Türk exclusively for the Göktürks, whom they portrayed as enemy aliens in their royal inscriptions. The Khazars may have kept the Göktürk tradition alive by claiming descent from the Ashina. When tribal leaders built their khanates, ruling over assorted tribes and tribal unions, the collected people identified themselves politically with the leadership. Turk became the designation for all subjects of the Turk empires. Nonetheless, subordinate tribes and tribal unions retained their original names, identities, and social structures. Memory of the Göktürks and the Ashina had faded by the turn of the millennium. The Karakhanids, Qocho Uyghurs, and Seljuks did not claim descent from the Göktürks.

History

Origins 

The Göktürk rulers originated from the Ashina clan, who were first attested to in 439. The Book of Sui reports that in that year, on October 18, the Tuoba ruler Emperor Taiwu of Northern Wei overthrew Juqu Mujian of the Northern Liang in eastern Gansu, whence 500 Ashina families fled northwest to the Rouran Khaganate in the vicinity of Gaochang.

According to the Book of Zhou and History of the Northern Dynasties, the Ashina clan was a component of the Xiongnu confederation, specifically, the Northern Xiongnu tribes or southern Xiongnu "who settled along the northern Chinese frontier", according to Edwin G. Pulleyblank. However, this view is contested. Göktürks were also posited as having originated from an obscure Suo state (索國) (MC: *sâk) which was situated north of the Xiongnu and had been founded by the Sakas. According to the Book of Sui and the Tongdian, they were "mixed Hu (barbarians)" from Pingliang (平涼), now in Gansu, Northwest China. Pointing to the Ashina's association with the Northern tribes of the Xiongnu, some researchers (e.g. Duan, Lung, etc.) proposed that Göktürks belonged in particular to the Tiele confederation, likewise Xiongnu-associated, by ancestral lineage. However, Lee and Kuang (2017) state that Chinese sources do not describe the Ashina-led Göktürks as descending from the Dingling or beloning to the Tiele confederation.

Chinese sources linked the Hu on their northern borders to the Xiongnu just as Graeco-Roman historiographers called the Pannonian Avars, Huns and Hungarians “Scythians". Such archaizing was a common literary topos, implying similar geographic origins and nomadic lifestyle but not direct filiation.

As part of the heterogeneous Rouran Khaganate, the Turks lived for generations north of the Altai Mountains, where they 'engaged in metal working for the Rouran'. According to Denis Sinor, the rise to power of the Ashina clan represented an 'internal revolution' in the Rouran Khaganate rather than an external conquest.

According to Charles Holcombe, the early Turk population was rather heterogeneous and many of the names of Turk rulers, including the two founding members, are not even Turkic. This is supported by evidence from the Orkhon inscriptions, which include several non-Turkic lexemes, possibly representing Uralic or Yeniseian words. Peter Benjamin Golden points out that the khaghans of the Turkic Khaganate, the Ashina, who were of an undetermined ethnic origin, adopted Iranian and Tokharian (or non-Altaic) titles, he also adds that this hypothesis assumes that they were not themselves lranian or Tokharian in speech. German Turkologist W.-E. Scharlipp points out that many common terms in Turkic are Iranian in origin. Whatever language the Ashina may have spoken originally, they and those they ruled would all speak Turkic, in a variety of dialects, and create, in a broadly defined sense, a common culture.

Expansion

The Göktürks reached their peak in late 6th century and began to invade the Sui Dynasty of China. However, the war ended due to the division of Turkic nobles and their civil war for the throne of Khagan. With the support of Emperor Wen of Sui, Yami Qaghan won the competition. However, the Göktürk empire was divided to Eastern and Western empires. Weakened by the civil war, Yami Qaghan declared allegiance to Sui Dynasty. When Sui began to decline, Shibi Khagan began to assault its territory and even surrounded Emperor Yang of Sui in Siege of Yanmen (615 AD) with 100,000 cavalry troops. After the collapse of Sui dynasty, the Göktürks intervened in the ensuing Chinese civil wars, providing support to the northeastern rebel Liu Heita against the rising Tang in 622 and 623. Liu enjoyed a long string of success but was finally routed by Li Shimin and other Tang generals and executed. The Tang dynasty was then established.

Conquest by the Tang 

Although the Göktürk Khaganate once provided support to the Tang Dynasty in the early period of the civil war during the collapse of the Sui dynasty, the conflicts between the Göktürks and Tang finally broke out when Tang was gradually reunifying China proper. The Göktürks began to attack and raid the northern border of the Tang Empire and once marched their main force to Chang'an, the capital of Tang. Having not recovered from the civil war, the Tang briefly had to pay tribute to Göktürk nobles. Allied with tribes opposing the Göktürk Khaganate, the Tang defeated the main force of Göktürk army in Battle of Yinshan four years later and captured Illig Qaghan in 630 AD. With the submission of the Turkic tribes, the Tang conquered the Mongolian Plateau.

After a vigorous court debate, Emperor Taizong decided to pardon the Göktürk nobles and offered them positions as imperial guards. However, the proposition was ended by a plan for the assassination of the emperor. On May 19, 639 Ashina Jiesheshuai and his tribesmen directly assaulted Emperor Taizong of Tang at Jiucheng Palace (in present-day Linyou County, Baoji, Shaanxi). However, they did not succeed and fled to the north, but were caught by pursuers near the Wei River and were killed. Ashina Hexiangu was exiled to Lingbiao. After the unsuccessful raid of Ashina Jiesheshuai, on August 13, 639 Taizong installed Qilibi Khan and ordered the settled Turkic people to follow him north of the Yellow River to settle between the Great Wall of China and the Gobi Desert. However, many Göktürk generals still remained loyal in service to the Tang Empire.

Revival

In 679, Ashide Wenfu and Ashide Fengzhi, who were Turkic leaders of the Chanyu Protectorate (單于大都護府), declared Ashina Nishufu as qaghan and revolted against the Tang dynasty. In 680, Pei Xingjian defeated Ashina Nishufu and his army. Ashina Nishufu was killed by his men. Ashide Wenfu made Ashina Funian a qaghan and again revolted against the Tang dynasty. Ashide Wenfu and Ashina Funian surrendered to Pei Xingjian. On December 5, 681 54 Göktürks, including Ashide Wenfu and Ashina Funian, were publicly executed in the Eastern Market of Chang'an. In 682, Ilterish Qaghan and Tonyukuk revolted and occupied Heisha Castle (northwest of present-day Hohhot, Inner Mongolia) with the remnants of Ashina Funian's men. The restored Göktürk Khaganate intervened in the war between Tang and Khitan tribes. However, after the death of Bilge Qaghan, the Göktürks could no longer subjugate other Turk tribes in the grasslands. In 744, allied with Tang Dynasty, the Uyghur Khaganate defeated the last Göktürk Khaganate and controlled the Mongolian Plateau.

Rulers

Religion
The religion was a monotheism with multiple gods. The great god was the sky, Tengri, who dispensed the viaticum for the journey of life (qut) and fortune (ulug) and watched over the cosmic order and the political and social order. People prayed to him and sacrificed to him, preferably with a white horse. The ruler, who came from him and derived his authority from him, was raised on a felt saddle to meet him. Tengri issued decrees, brought pressure to bear on human beings, and enforced capital punishment, often by striking the offender with lightning. The many secondary powers – sometimes named deities, sometimes spirits or simply said to be sacred, and almost always associated with Tengri – were the Earth, the Mountain, Water, the Springs, and the Rivers; the master/possessors of all objects, particularly of the land and the waters of the nation; trees, cosmic axes, and sources of life; fire, the symbol of the family and alterego of the shaman; the stars, particularly the sun and the moon, the Pleiades, and Venus, whose image changes over time; Umay, a mother goddess who is none other than the placenta; the threshold and the doorjamb; personifications of Time, the Road, Desire, etc.; heroes and ancestors embodied in the banner, in tablets with inscriptions, and in idols; and spirits wandering or fixed in Penates or in all kinds of holy objects. These and other powers have an uneven force which increases as objects accumulate, as trees form a forest, stones form a cairn, arrows form a quiver, and drops of water form a lake.

Genetics

A genetic study published in Nature in May 2018 examined the remains of four elite Türk soldiers buried between ca. 300 AD and 700 AD. The extracted samples of Y-DNA belonged to haplogroup Q (sample DA86), haplogroup R1 (samples DA89, DA224) and Haplogroup O (sample DA228). The extracted samples of mtDNA belonged to C4b1 (sample DA86), A14(samples DA89), H2a (samples DA224) and A15c (sample DA228). The examined Türks were found to have more East Asian ancestry than the preceding Tian Shan Huns. Evidence of European ancestry was also detected, suggesting ongoing contacts with Europe. Succeeding Turkic states of Central Asia displayed even higher levels of East Asian ancestry, indicating that the Turkification of Central Asia was carried out by dominant minorities of East Asian origin.

A 2023 study published in the Journal of Systematics and Evolution analyzed the DNA of Empress Ashina, a Royal Göktürk, whose remains were recovered from a mausoleum in Xianyang, China. The authors determined that Empress Ashina belonged to the North-East Asian mtDNA haplogroup F1d. Approximately 96-98% of her autosomal ancestry was of East Asian origin, while roughly 2-4% was of West Eurasian origin, indicating ancient admixture. The authors state that their results are consistent with a North-East Asian origin of the royal Ashina family. However, they also noted that central-steppe Türks and early medieval Türks exhibit a high (but variable) degree of West Eurasian ancestry, which indicates that there was genetic sub-structure within the Türkic empire. The authors said that central-steppe Türks and early medieval Türks were not closely related to the Ashina family. The authors proposed that Türkic languages spread throughout Eurasia by a model of cultural diffusion rather than demic diffusion.

Gallery

See also

Göktürk family tree
Horses in East Asian warfare
Khazars
Timeline of the Turkic peoples (500–1300)
Silver Deer of Bilge Khan

In popular culture
Kürşat, fictional character based on Göktürk prince Ashina Jiesheshuai
Göktürk-1, Göktürk-2, Göktürk-3 satellites named after Göktürks
Gokturk exoplanet named after Gökturks

References

Sources
 
 
 
 
 
 
Great Soviet Encyclopaedia, 3rd ed. Article "Turkic Khaganate" (online ).
Grousset, René. The Empire of the Steppes. Rutgers University Press, 1970. .
Gumilev, Lev (2007)  The Göktürks (Древние тюрки ;Drevnie ti︠u︡rki). Moscow: AST, 2007. .

Yu. Zuev (I︠U︡. A. Zuev) (2002) , "Early Türks: Essays on history and ideology" (Rannie ti︠u︡rki: ocherki istorii i ideologii), Almaty, Daik-Press, p. 233, 

Wink, André. Al-Hind: The Making of the Indo-Islamic World. Brill Academic Publishers, 2002. .
Zhu, Xueyuan (朱学渊) (2004)  The Origins of the Ethnic Groups of Northern China (中国北方诸族的源流). Beijing: Zhonghua Shuju (中华书局) 
Xue, Zongzheng (薛宗正) (1992)  A History of the Turks (突厥史). Beijing: Chinese Social Sciences Press (中国社会科学出版社) 

 
Turkic peoples of Asia
Ethnic groups in Chinese history
Nomadic groups in Eurasia
6th century in Asia
7th century in Asia
8th century in Asia
Extinct Turkic peoples
Former confederations